The Yamaha SZ16 is a light motorcycle manufactured by the India Yamaha Motor. Introduced in 2010, it comes in naked as well as faired variants. It has a carbureted single-cylinder, air-cooled, four-stroke engine, displacing .

A new model for the Philippine market was launched for 2015. The engine has a lower 149.3cc displacement. Minor changes were made as it is now equipped with a kill switch. The instrument cluster has also been redesigned. The passenger one-piece rear grab bar was replaced by a split aluminum grab bar.  It is offered in 3 color options: vivid red, dark purplish blue metallic and matte black.

References

External links
 Yamaha official SZ home

sz
Standard motorcycles
Motorcycles introduced in 2010